The Expert or The Experts may refer to:

Film and television
 The Expert (TV series), a 1968 British TV series
 The Expert (1932 film), a 1932 American film
 The Expert (1995 film), a 1995 film starring James Brolin
 The Experts (1973 film), a 1973 German film
 The Experts (1989 film), a 1989 American film

Other uses
 The Expert (album), a 2005 album by Taiwanese Mandopop artist Wilber Pan
 The Expert, a member of the Irish rapper-producer duo Messiah J and the Expert
The Experts (painting), an 1837 painting by Alexandre-Gabriel Decamps

See also
Expert (disambiguation)